An interrupter is a device used to interrupt the flow of a steady direct electrical current.

Interrupter may also refer to:

 Interrupter gear, gear for interrupting the fire of a machine gun on an airplane to enable it to fire through a spinning propeller
 The Interrupter, a character portrayed by American comedian Brian Stack
 USS Interrupter, a Guardian-class radar picket ship renamed USS Tracer

See also
 Interruption (disambiguation)
 The Interrupters,  a 2011 documentary film
 The Interrupters (band), an American ska punk band